The Lotus 91 was a car used by the English team Lotus in the 1982 Formula One season, designed by Colin Chapman, Martin Ogilvie and Tony Rudd.

Design 
After several uncompetitive seasons with experimental or uncompetitive cars, Colin Chapman went back to basics and designed the Lotus 91, based in part on the Williams FW07 and Lotus' own 88 design. Powered by the Ford Cosworth DFV and using a standard Hewland gearbox, the 91 was uncomplicated and easy to maintain. Following Brabham's lead, the new car was the first Lotus chassis to use carbon brakes, improving braking performance considerably.

After a design study by Chapman into new composite materials, the decision was taken to build the car in carbon fibre and Kevlar, making it, after the McLaren MP4/1, the second F1 car to race to be built from the material - the Lotus 88 not having raced before it was banned.

Under the direction of Peter Warr, the team worked hard to make the car as competitive as possible. The lightweight chassis gave the 91 a fighting chance against the far more powerful turbo engined cars and Cosworth worked on a short stroke version of the DFV purely for Lotus' use. The sidepods full length units, extending to the very back of the car to take full advantage of the ground effect aerodynamics. However the 91 was quite pitch sensitive, making it tricky to drive. The Lotus 91 was the basis for the Lotus 92 - which pioneered active suspension in Formula 1. This suspension was revolutionary, using an on-board system to control the ride height and behaviour of the suspension, thus the Lotus 92 was the first car to be fitted with active suspension. The system was partially controlled by computers but at this early stage was mostly operated by hydro-pneumatic valves.

Racing history 
Elio de Angelis used the car well but found the 91 was mostly competitive on ultra fast tracks like Hockenheim, Monza and the Österreichring. The latter track provided a thrilling final lap win for De Angelis against Keke Rosberg in the Williams. That as well as several other podium places helped the team to fifth in the final standings in 1982, before ground effects were banned for the 1983 Formula One season and the 91 was replaced by the first Lotus turbo car.

The 91 was the last Lotus F1 car to win a race under Colin Chapman's rule before he died of a heart attack on 16 December 1982.

Complete Formula One results
(key)

References

91